is a Prefectural Natural Park in southern Nagano Prefecture, Japan. Established in 1970, the park's central feature is the Tenryū River. The park spans the borders of the municipalities of Iida, Matsukawa, Nakagawa, Ōshika, Takagi, Takamori, and Toyooka.

See also
 National Parks of Japan

References

External links
  Map of the parks of Nagano Prefecture

Parks and gardens in Nagano Prefecture
Protected areas established in 1970
1970 establishments in Japan
Iida, Nagano
Matsukawa, Nagano (Shimoina)
Nakagawa, Nagano
Ōshika, Nagano
Takagi, Nagano 
Takamori, Nagano
Toyooka, Nagano